Alain Turnier (died 1991) was a Haitian historian. He is the author of several best-selling books:

 Les Etats-Unis et le Marché Haïtien
 Avec Mérisier Jeannis
 Quand la Nation Demande des Comptes

He was Minister of Finance briefly in 1956 and in 1988.

References

 

Finance ministers of Haiti
Year of birth missing
1991 deaths
20th-century Haitian historians
Haitian male writers